A vigil is a period of purposeful sleeplessness or watchfulness.

Vigil may also refer to:

Film, television and theatre 
 Vigil (film), a 1984 New Zealand film directed  by Vincent Ward
 The Vigil (1914 film), an American short silent drama film
 The Vigil (1998 film), a Canadian comedy film
 The Vigil (2019 film), an  American horror film
 Vigil (TV series), a British police procedural television serial set on the fictional submarine HMS Vigil
 "The Vigil" (Dynasty 1984), a television episode
 "The Vigil" (Dynasty 1986), a television episode
 The Vigil, fictional creatures from the Doctor Who episode "The Rings of Akhaten"
 Vigil (musical), a 2017 Australian musical by Steve Vizard and Joe Chindamo

Literature 
Jagari (English: The Vigil), a 1945 novel by Satinath Bhaduri
 Wraith (Image Comics), or Vigil, a comic book character
 Vigil (novel), a 2016 novel by Angela Slatter

Music 
 Vigil (band), a 1980s American rock band
 Vigil (album), by the Easybeats, 1968
 The Vigil (album), by Chick Corea, 2013
 "Vigil", a song by Fish from Vigil in a Wilderness of Mirrors, 1990
 "Vigil", a song by Lamb of God from As the Palaces Burn, 2003
 "The Vigil", a song by Blue Öyster Cult from Mirrors, 1979

Video games 
 Vigil: Blood Bitterness, a 2006 video game
 Vigil Games, a defunct American game developer

Other uses 
 Candlelight vigil, a method of remembrance, especially following a tragedy
 Vigil (horse) (foaled 1873), an American Thoroughbred racehorse
 Vigil (liturgy), a night prayer service in ancient Christianity
 Vigil (surname)
 Vigil Honor, a Boy Scouts of America Order of the Arrow honor
 Vigil, a village in the parish of Santa Eulalia de Vigil, Asturias, Spain
 The Vigil, an 1884 painting by John Pettie

See also 
 Vigiles, firefighters and nightwatchmen of Ancient Rome